Alexandra "Alex" Walsh (born July 31, 2001) is an American competitive swimmer. She won a silver medal in the women's 200-meter individual medley event at the 2020 Summer Olympics in Tokyo, Japan. At the 2022 FINA World Championships in Budapest, Hungary, she won gold in the women's 200-meter individual medley. Walsh is the current U.S. Open record holder in the women's 200-meter individual medley. She is the former American record holder in the women's 200-yard individual medley. She is a member of the current American record relays in the 4x50 yard freestyle relay, 4x100 yard freestyle relay, 4x100 yard medley relay and 4x200 short course meter freestyle record. Alex is known for her incredible versatility in all four strokes.

Background 
Alex Walsh was born in Nashville, Tennessee. Her parents are Robert and Glynis Walsh. Glynis also swam competitively and was captain of the Boston College Women’s Swim Team in 1993. The Walsh family moved to Old Greenwich, CT, and Alex attended Old Greenwich Elementary School. She began her competitive swimming career at age 7 as a member of the Greenwich YWCA Dolphins, coached by Nick Cavataro. She later joined the Chelsea Piers Aquatic Club in Stamford, Connecticut, coached by Kailey Morris and Jamie Barone. She swam in the summers for the Rocky Point Club, coached by Terry Lowe.

In 2014, the Walsh family moved back to Nashville, Tennessee when Alex was 13-years old. There, she competed for the Nashville Aquatic Club, coached by John Morse and Doug Wharam. Walsh attended middle and high school at Harpeth Hall School. Her high school team, coached by Polly Linden, captured two state swimming and diving championships in 2017 and 2018 and were named SwimmingWorld National Champions in 2018 and 2019. She graduated from Harpeth Hall School in 2020.

Walsh represents the University of Virginia, which competes in the NCAA Division I Women's Swimming and Diving. Her current coaches are Todd DeSorbo and Blaire Bachman. Walsh has a younger sister, Gretchen Walsh, who is also a competitive swimmer. The sisters are teammates at UVA, and they helped lead the team to two NCAA Division I National Championships in 2021 and 2022. Alex is a computer science major at UVA.

Swimming career

Early career (2014–2019) 
Walsh first made national headlines at the age of 12 when she broke three 11–12 Girl’s National Age Group records in the 100 yard individual medley, 100 yard backstroke, and 200 yard breaststroke at the Connecticut Age Group Championships in March 2014. As a 12-year old, her 200 yard breaststroke time of 2:15.64 also set a new pool record at Wesleyan University. As a 13-year old member of the Nashville Aquatics Club, Walsh qualified for Olympic Trials (2015) in the women’s 100 and 200 meter backstroke. Later that year, Alex broke Missy Franklin’s National Age Group record in the 13–14 girl’s 200 yard individual medley with a time of 1:56.20. At age 14, she was a semi-finalist at the 2016 Olympic Swimming Trials in Omaha, Nebraska in both the women’s 100 and 200-meter backstroke in which she placed 14th and 11th respectively. Walsh continued to break multiple National Age Group records throughout high school career. In 2018, Alex set the NISCA Independent School Record in the 100 yard breast stroke. She was an eight-time NISCA/Speedo High School Swimming All-American.  

Her international experience began as a member of the USA National Junior Team in 2015. She competed at the 2016 Junior Pan Pacific Championships in Maui, Hawaii, 2017 Junior World Championship in Indianapolis, Indiana, and 2018 Junior World Championships in Suva, Fiji. Alex Walsh became a member of the USA National Team in 2017. In 2019, She represented the United States in the Pan American Games held in Lima, Peru. In total, she won three gold medals: two individual gold medals in the women's 200-meter individual medley and women's 200-meter backstroke and a gold medal in the women’s 4x200 m freestyle relay. Later in 2019, Walsh competed at the U.S. Open Swimming Championships in Atlanta Georgia. She won silver behind Olympian, Melanie Margalis, in the women's 200-meter individual medley. Her time of 2:09.01 shattered the 17–18 Girl’s National Age Group record previously set by Elizabeth Pelton in 2011.

Olympics and World Championships 
Walsh won the women’s 200-meter individual medley at the 2020 U.S. Olympic Swim Trials with a time of 2:09.30 to qualify for the 2020 Summer Olympic Games in Tokyo, Japan. The race had the closest finish in the history of the Olympic Swimming Trials with only 0.04 seconds separating first place finisher Alex Walsh, second place finisher Kate Douglass, and third place finisher Madisyn Cox. The race was ranked one of the top moments of the Olympic Swim Trials. At the 2020 Tokyo Olympics, Alex Walsh won silver in the women's 200-meter individual medley. A thriller of a race, Walsh led down the stretch in the freestyle portion. She finished with a time of 2:08.65 just behind Japan’s Yui Ohashi by 0.13 seconds.

In 2022, Alex competed in the US International Team Trials and qualified for the 2022 World Aquatic Championships team in the women’s 4x200-meter freestyle relay. The relay placed sixth in the final with a time of 1:57.84. Walsh also won the women’s 200-meter individual medley setting a new U.S. Open record in the final of the event with a winning time of 2:07.84.

Walsh became World Champion at the 2022 FINA World Championships in Budapest, Hungary. Her gold medal winning time (2:07:13) in the women’s 200 meter individual medley was more than a 1.5 seconds faster than the second place finisher. The race rocketed Alex's career, making her the 2nd fastest American of all time and 5th fastest world performer of all time. In total, she finished the 2022 World Championships as a three-time gold medalist also winning gold in the women’s 4 x 200 meter freestyle relay and women’s 4 x 100 meter medley relay.

In 2022, Walsh represented the United States at the 2022 FINA Short Course World Championship in Melbourne, Australia. She was a six-time medalist winning 3 golds, 2 silvers and 1 bronze participating in one individual event and 5 relays. In the women’s 200-meter individual medley, Kate Douglass and Alex Walsh finished first (2:02.12) and second (2:03.37), respectively. Both swimmers broke the previous American record and became the only women ever in U.S. history to break 2:04. Walsh swam the first leg of the 4x200-meter freestyle relay, which won bronze and broke the American record with a time of 7:34.70.

NCAA and University of Virginia 
In her first year, Walsh won the 200 yard individual medley, finished third in the 200 yard backstroke and finished fourth in the 100 yard breaststroke at the 2021 Atlantic Coast Conference (ACC) Championships. She swam on four of UVA's first place relays (200 free relay, 400 free relay, 800 free relay, 400 medley relay). Alex Walsh was named ACC Rookie of the Year.

At the 2021 NCAA Division I Women's Swimming Championships, Walsh anchored the women's 4 x 200 yard freestyle relay to first place which marked the University of Virginia's first ever NCAA relay title in program history.  She was the NCAA champion in the 200 yard individual medley, finished fifth in the 200 yard breaststroke and fifth in the 200 yard freestyle. She was part of the 200 and 400 freestyle relays that finished second.

At the 2022 ACC Championships, Walsh was a three-time individual champion in the 200 yard individual medley, 200 yard freestyle and 200 yard breaststroke and also won three relay titles. At the 2022 NCAA Division I Women's Swimming Championships, Walsh won three individual titles to include the 200 yard individual medley, 400 yard individual medley and 200 yard butterfly. She set an American, NCAA, U.S. Open and pool record in the 200 yard individual medley with a time of 1:50.08. She swam on the 400 medley relay and 400 freestyle relay that broke the NCAA, American and U.S. Open and pool records. Alex also participated in the 800 freestyle relay, which placed second.

Outside the pool 
Walsh was featured in Mary Ellen Pethel's book entitled Title IX, Pat Summit, and Tennessee's Trailblazers: 50 Years, 50 Stories. The book was published in 2022 to celebrate the 50th anniversary of Title IX and to honor female athletes and coaches with connections to the state of Tennessee. Walsh spoke about opportunities available for current NCAA athletes due after the passage of the NCAA NIL (name image likeness) Policy in 2021. She also discussed the social pressures that come with being an athlete on social media. When commenting about her future she is quoted as saying "I've come a long way, but I've still got a long way to go."

Alex and her sister, Gretchen Walsh, made history as being the first NCAA athletes to ever launch an apparel line with a major retailer after the passage of the NIL (name, image, likeness). In September of 2022, Alex and Gretchen Walsh released a collaboration with Sporti by Swimoutlet.com and created their swimsuit line called, Sporti x Alex + Gretchen Walsh. In an article entitled "The Walsh Sisters: From the Olympics to Swimwear Designers," Alex said: "After the summer Olympics in 2021, I signed with Swim Outlet, and they had the idea of doing a swimsuit line collaboration. Then Gretchen hopped on and signed on with them too. We immediately knew we would do it together. She’s also one of the fastest swimmers in the world."

Awards and honors 
 Nominee for the 2022 USA Swimming Golden Goggles: Female Swimmer of the Year 
 Nominee for the 2022 USA Swimming Golden Goggles: Female Race of the Year 
 ACC Championships February 2022: Women's Most Valuable Swimmer of the meet
 SwimSwam, Ultra Swimmer of the Month: March 2022
 All-American 2022: 200 individual medley, 400 individual medley, 200 butterfly, 200 freestyle relay, 400 freestyle relay, 800 freestyle relay, 400 medley relay 
 All-American 2021: 200 individual medley, 200 breaststroke, 200 freestyle, 200 freestyle relay, 400 freestyle relay, 800 freestyle relay
 ACC Women's Rookie of the Year 2021
 VaSID Rookie of the Year 2021
 Tennessee High School Female MVP 2016 to 2019

Records 

Legend: NR – American record; US – US Open record

Legend: NR – American record; US – US Open record

Legend: NR – American record; US – US Open record

References

External links
 
 
 Alexandra Walsh at the 2019 Pan American Games
 Alex Walsh at University of Virginia

Living people
2001 births
Sportspeople from Nashville, Tennessee
American female backstroke swimmers
American female medley swimmers
Pan American Games gold medalists for the United States
Pan American Games medalists in swimming
Swimmers at the 2019 Pan American Games
Medalists at the 2019 Pan American Games
Swimmers at the 2020 Summer Olympics
Olympic swimmers of the United States
Medalists at the 2020 Summer Olympics
Olympic silver medalists for the United States in swimming
Virginia Cavaliers women's swimmers
21st-century American women
Swimmers from Tennessee
World Aquatics Championships medalists in swimming
Medalists at the FINA World Swimming Championships (25 m)